The Sanix World Rugby Youth Invitational Tournament is an international rugby union tournament for 15-a-side youth teams which is held every year during the Golden Week holidays (29 April – 5/6 May) in Fukuoka prefecture, Japan. Participation is by invitation only, and the overseas schools selected by their respective unions to represent their country are generally expected to be of a high standard and among the top five in each country. The event is hosted by the Japan Rugby Football Union and supported by various local bodies including the Kyushu RFU, the Sanix Sports Foundation and Munakata City. The Global Arena in Munakata, Fukuoka on the island of Kyūshū is the venue for this tournament.

History

In 2000 the first tournament was contested by 11 Japanese and five foreign high school teams from various countries. (The tournament expanded from 16 to 20 schools in 2009, thus increasing in both size and importance.) It is a unique competition in world rugby for high schools, and is almost a "mini World Cup". The idea was devised and initially funded by the Sanix company president Mr. Munemasa. Sanix still provides about half the substantial costs for overseas teams to participate.

Three or four of the Japanese teams are from the local area Kyūshū, where high school rugby is particularly strong. The rest are from elsewhere in Japan. A Scottish pipe band is a regular fixture, though there was no band in 2007. However Dollar Academy has participated twice as Scotland's sole representative so far in the tournament in 2000 and 2004, and George Watson's College Pipe Band, Edinburgh have played both the opening and closing ceremonies from 2008 to date. One Italian team (Istituto Casteller) took part in 2002, and Camarthenshire College from Wales has also participated.

In 2014 the tournament debuted a girls' rugby sevens tournament to run parallel to the boys' competition. The debut girls' tournament was won by a Kanto regional selection team, and the most recent champions are St Mary's College, Wellington who won the 2017 tournament.

Competing nations

As of 2018 a total of 20 countries have participated in at least one edition of the Sanix World Rugby Youth Tournament, with many countries being represented annually. Nations who have competed in the tournament are as follows:

Champions

Boys' competition

Schools with multiple appearances

In the table below, teams are ordered first by number of appearances, then by number of wins, and finally by year of first appearance. In the "Seasons" column, bold years indicate winning seasons.

Girls' sevens competition

See also

Fukuoka Sanix Blues
Rugby union in Japan
National High School Rugby Tournament
The National Schools 7's

References

External links
Tournament Official Website (English) with downloadable pdfs of results
Invitation on Australian Schools rugby website
RKS (Fiji) at the 2002 tournament
2007 Sanix World Youth TournamentWebsite (from the JRFU, in Japanese)
Sanix World Youth Tournament – Map To The Global Arena (in Japanese)
Global Arena (in Japanese)

International rugby union competitions hosted by Japan
Rugby in Kyushu
High school rugby union
Sport in Fukuoka Prefecture